It was a Getic fortified settlement.

References

Dacian fortresses in Constanța County